Lost island may refer to:
a lost continent or island, see lost lands
the fictional island of the television series Lost, see Mythology of Lost#The Island
the "Lost Island" - the response by Gaunilo of Marmoutiers to Anselm's logical proof of the existence of God